Ross Dunlop (born ) is a New Zealand local-body politician. He was mayor of the South Taranaki District from 2007 to 2019.

Dunlop lives near Ohawe. He is a farmer with interests in dairy, sheep, beef and forestry. He was first elected as a district councillor in 1986, and was elected mayor in 2007. He was re-elected unopposed for a fourth term in 2016.

Dunlop is one of New Zealand's longest serving local body politicians. Having served 33 years in local government. He was first elected to the Hawera District Council in 1986. The South Taranaki District was formed in 1989 and Dunlop was elected as a councillor to the new council. He was chairman of the Hawera Community Board and then went onto chair the Environment and Hearing Committee. He chaired a number of hearing applications including the consent for the Kupe oil and gas production station. He served with Mayor Mary Bourke and when she stood down in 2007 he stood for the mayoralty. He won against seven candidates.

During Dunlop's term of office there has been a new multi sport stadium—the Hub—opened. New water treatment facilities for Hāwera, Ōpunake, Patea and Waimate West and upgraded water treatment for Eltham, Waverley. The Hawera CBD has been a major focus and a new Countdown supermarket and new laneways and a proposed new library/cultural centre are all helping invigorate the town centre.

Dunlop led the council treaty settlement negotiations with Taranaki iwi and Nga Ruahine iwi. Significant Council properties were returned to iwi. One of the most important and historic properties, Te Ngutu O Te Manu, was returned to Nga Ruahine iwi. Te Ngutu O Te Manu was the home of Nga Ruahine chief Titokowaru. He successfully repelled two attacks by colonial forces on the village in 1868. Major Gustavus Von Tempsky was killed in the attack.

A request by Iwi to fly the Tino Rangatiratanga flag in the council chamber was supported by Dunlop.

A programme of cycleways and walkways is progressing with a pathway connecting Hawera to the coast at Waihi Beach completed.

Dunlop is very interested in preserving local history, preserving heritage buildings and protecting and planting trees.

In November 2018, Dunlop awarded a prize in the Hawera Christmas parade to the Hawera women's Lions Club float, with a black and white theme. Their blackened faces caused some community offence. Dunlop said that he "wasn't paying much attention" and he apologised.

References

1950s births
Living people
Mayors of places in Taranaki
Year of birth missing (living people)